Pingtan Township is a township under the administration of Tongdao Dong Autonomous County, Hunan, China. , it administers the following 16 villages:
Pingtan Village
Hengling Village
Pingri Village
Gaoben Village
Shuangceng Village
Xiapan Village
Banpo Village
Huangdu Village
Dutian Village
Zhongbu Village
Pingzhai Village
Daping Village
Shuangji Village
Lingnan Village
Gaobu Village
Lianping Village

References 

Townships of Huaihua
Tongdao